Valdeir da Silva Santos or simply Valdeir is an assistant coach and former Brazilian footballer who played as a midfielder. He is currently without a club.

Career

K-League
On 1 July 2009, he moved to K-League side Daegu FC.

Honours
Alagoas State League: 1995
São Paulo State League (3rd division): 2001

References

External links

Living people
1977 births
Association football forwards
Brazilian footballers
Brazilian expatriate footballers
Clube de Regatas Brasil players
Associação Desportiva Confiança players
Esporte Clube São Bento players
Treze Futebol Clube players
Londrina Esporte Clube players
Dijon FCO players
Expatriate footballers in France
Guarani FC players
Vila Nova Futebol Clube players
Clube 15 de Novembro players
Brazilian expatriate sportspeople in South Korea
Grêmio Foot-Ball Porto Alegrense players
Sociedade Esportiva do Gama players
Ipatinga Futebol Clube players
Clube Náutico Capibaribe players
K League 1 players
Daegu FC players
Expatriate footballers in South Korea
Club Bolívar players
Expatriate footballers in Bolivia
FC Oberneuland players
People from Maceió
Sportspeople from Alagoas